Spirobassia is a monotypic plant genus with the species Spirobassia hirsuta.

It has cosmopolitan distribution.

Synonyms for the species:
 Bassia hirsuta

References

Amaranthaceae
Monotypic Caryophyllales genera
Amaranthaceae genera